The USGS GNIS lists 12 mountains in the United States named Steamboat Mountain:

Steamboat Mountain is also the name of a school.